Caduceus was a convict ship that transported a single convict from Bombay, India to Fremantle, Western Australia in 1858. It arrived in Fremantle on 5 February 1858. The convict, Patrick Devlin, was a 31-year-old soldier who had been convicted of a breach of articles of war by court-martial in Hyderabad State in December 1855, and sentenced to 14 years' transportation. In addition to Devlin, there were three other passengers on board.

See also
List of convict ship voyages to Western Australia
Convict era of Western Australia

References

Convict ships to Western Australia